Malibu Spring Break is a 2003 comedy starring future (August 2004) Playboy Bunny Pilar Lastra, along with Kristin Novak and Charity Rahmer. It was Crown International Pictures' first (and only) release after 14 years of dormancy.

Plot
Michelle (Rahmer) and Brianne (Novak) are two college girls who want to have a fun spring break. They decide to take a trip from Arizona to Malibu, and plan on staying with Michelle's Uncle Benny. The only problem is that they never told him they were coming.  However, luck is on their side because he will be going out of town that afternoon.

Uncle Benny forbids that there be any parties, saying that the last time he trusted a neighbor to house sit, they threw a wild party, and that he hates parties. Meanwhile, he is having an affair with a next door neighbor.

When Michelle and Brian get there, they meet the not-so-preppy Gloria, who is filling in as maid because her mother is sick. She immediately clashes with Michelle and Brianne.

Later, Michelle's nerdy cousin Denise flies out to Malibu. Although they don't get along all that well, Denise is happy to see her cousin Michelle. At this point, Michelle, Brianne, Denise and Gloria decide to team up and throw a party as a bet to see who could get more people to come. The teams are Brianne and Michelle against Denise and Gloria.

Randy and Jeff, two workers at a local hotel, get word of this. Randy is perceived as a "man whore", while Jeff is more of a sensitive guy. Jeff later meets Denise, and has an immediate attraction to her even though Randy refers to her as "plain" and an "ugly duckling."

Word of the party spreads quickly, and it soon becomes out of control. Randy (who had earlier been rejected by Michelle) goes after her again. She takes him upstairs, but leave him there naked, where he is later found masturbating by Denise and Jeff.

Before the party, while the girls were getting ready and giving Denise a makeover to make her less frumpy, they missed a call from Uncle Benny, saying he will be home early.

He comes home in the midst of the party, but has to sneak in because he refuses to pay the bouncer for his entry. He clears everyone out, and finds Michelle passed out with a hangover in his bed. He discovers that his neighbor, whom he was dating, knew about the party. She convinces him that the girls are just kids, and it is okay.

With the money they raised at the door, the girls pay for all the damages. In return, Uncle Benny buys all four of them tickets to Hawaii for next spring break, to ensure that they won't be back for more parties.

External links
 

2003 films
Crown International Pictures films
2000s English-language films